Neocussonia is a genus of flowering plants belonging to the family Araliaceae.

Its native range is Tanzania to s. Africa and Madagascar. It is also found in the Cape Provinces, KwaZulu-Natal, the Northern Provinces (regions of South Africa), Malawi, Mozambique, Eswatini and Zimbabwe.

The genus name of Neocussonia is in honour of Pierre Cusson (1727–1783), a French botanist who specialised in Umbelliferae, and it was first described and published in Gen. Fl. Pl. Vol.2 on page 79 in 1967.

Known species
According to Kew:

References

Araliaceae
Apiales genera
Plants described in 1967
Flora of South Tropical Africa
Flora of Southern Africa